William Fenn (September 14, 1904 – December 22, 1980) was an American cyclist. He competed in two events at the 1924 Summer Olympics.

References

External links
 

1904 births
1980 deaths
American male cyclists
Olympic cyclists of the United States
Cyclists at the 1924 Summer Olympics
Sportspeople from Newark, New Jersey